White birch is a common name for Betula papyrifera, a species of tree native to northern North America.

White birch may also refer to:

Trees
 Betula pubescens (Betula alba), European white birch, downy birch
 Betula pendula, silver birch, warty birch, European white birch

Other uses
 White Birch, Edmonton, Alberta, Canada
 White Birch Village, a resort in Wisconsin
 The White Birch (band), Norwegian recording artists
 The White Birch (album), a 1994 album by Codeine
 Shirakabaha (Japanese: 白樺派, literally "White Birch Society"), a Japanese literary group